Alisher Burkhanovich Usmanov (born 9 September 1953) is an Uzbek–Russian businessman and oligarch. By 2022, Usmanov had an estimated net worth of $19.5 billion and was among the world's 100 wealthiest people.

Usmanov made his wealth after the collapse of the Soviet Union, through metal and mining operations, and investments. He is the majority shareholder of Metalloinvest, a Russian industrial conglomerate, which consolidated in 2006 JSC Metalloinvest's assets (Mikhailovsky GOK and Ural Steel) with those of Gazmetall JSC (Lebedinsky GOK and the Oskol Electrometallurgical Plant).

He owns the Kommersant publishing house. He is also a co-owner of Russia's second-largest mobile telephone operator, MegaFon, and owner of Udokan copper which develops one of the largest copper deposits in the world. Usmanov eventually teamed up with Yuri Milner and became the largest investor of Digital Sky Technologies ("DST"). On 16 September 2010, Digital Sky Technologies (DST) changed its name to "Mail.ru Group". He also holds shares of a number of international technology companies. He was the president of the Fédération Internationale d'Escrime, the international governing body of the sport of fencing, from 2008 until 2022.

On 28 February 2022, in reaction to the 2022 Russian invasion of Ukraine, the European Union blacklisted Usmanov, imposing an EU-wide travel ban on him and freezing all his assets. On 3 March, the United States imposed similar sanctions on him, with some exceptions for his companies. Usmanov was named in the Official Journal of the European Union, the publication of record of the EU, as a "pro-Kremlin oligarch with particularly close ties to Russian President Vladimir Putin [who is] one of Vladimir Putin's favorite oligarchs."

He spent six years in a Soviet prison in the 1980s on charges of fraud and embezzlement, but his conviction was later overturned. In 2000, he was eventually rehabilitated by the Supreme Court of Uzbekistan, which ruled that the case against him was trumped up and no crime had been committed.

Early life; education, imprisonment, marriage and divorce
Usmanov was born in Uzbekistan in the provincial town of Chust. He spent his childhood in the capital Tashkent, where his father was a state prosecutor. Planning to pursue a career of a diplomat, he later moved to Moscow. After first failing to be accepted, one year later he made  the cut and was accepted to the Moscow State Institute of International Relations, from which he graduated in 1976 with a degree in international law. Usmanov then returned to Tashkent, where he was appointed director of the Foreign Economic Association of the Soviet Peace Committee.

Usmanov was arrested and convicted on charges of fraud, corruption, and theft of state property, which charges included shaking down an Army officer, in Uzbek SSR in August 1980. He was imprisoned in a remote Uzbek prison for six years of an eight-year sentence. Three decades later, his conviction was vacated in July 2000, nine years after the dissolution of the Soviet Union, by the Supreme Court of Uzbekistan, which ruled that "the original conviction was unjust, no crime was ever committed, and that the evidence was fabricated." His version of events has been questioned by Craig Murray, the British Ambassador to Uzbekistan from 2002 to 2004. Years later, Usmanov's public relations firm tried to delete reference to his conviction and imprisonment from Wikipedia.

Usmanov, who is Muslim, married Jewish rhythmic gymnastics coach Irina Viner in 1992.  Viner is considered to be close to Putin, having introduced him to former rhythmic gymnast Alina Kabaeva.
On May 4, 2022, Usmanov filed divorce from Irina Viner.

Business career

Pro-Putin oligarch

Usmanov was named in the Official Journal of the European Union, the publication of record of the EU, as a "pro-Kremlin oligarch with particularly close ties to Russian President Vladimir Putin". It added: "[Usmanov] has been referred to as one of Vladimir Putin's favorite  oligarchs. He is considered to be one of Russia's businessmen-officials, who were entrusted with servicing financial flows, but their positions depend on the will of the President."

Early years
Usmanov became a dollar millionaire in the years before the Soviet Union collapsed. He set up a privately owned for-profit company, cooperative Agroplast which produced plastic bags. He enriched himself considerably after the collapse of the USSR.

Usmanov worked as the Deputy General Director of Intercross JSC from 1990 to 1994, and from 1994 to 1998, he headed Interfin Interbank Investment and Finance Company. He also acted as an Adviser to the General Director of Moscow Aviation Industrial Enterprise from 1994 to 1995, and served as the First Deputy Chairman of MAPO-Bank from 1995 to 1997.

In the end of the 90s Usmanov was the General Director of Gazprom Invest Holdings, the investment-holding subsidiary of Russia's state-owned gas company Gazprom, and managed it for more than a decade; Usmanov left the company in 2014.

USM Holdings and Metalloinvest 
Usmanov has a 49% economic interest and 100% voting rights in USM, a global conglomerate with its main investments in metals and mining industry, telecommunications, technology, and media. Through USM and as an individual investor, Usmanov owns diverse interests including stakes in iron ore and steel, media, and internet companies.

He is the co-owner of Metalloinvest, which he founded with business partner Vasiliy Anisimov, in order to manage his acquisitions in the metal industry. Unlike Russia's tycoons who won control of empires through loans-for-share privatization schemes of the 1990s, Usmanov built up Metalloinvest through a series of acquisitions. Metalloinvest owns a wide range of Russian metal and mining businesses including Lebedinsky GOK and Mikhailovsky GOK; Oskol Elektrometallurgical Plant and Ural Steel steel mills and a ferrous scrap enterprise – Ural Scrap Company.

Since 2006, he has acquired stakes in Australia-based mining companies, Medusa, Mt Gibson and Aztec Resources through Gallagher Holdings, now USM Holdings. In 2009, Metalloinvest Holding sold its 10.37% stake in Australian gold producer Medusa Mining. Usmanov is the second largest shareholder, after Dr Mohammed Al Bawani (MB Holding), in Toronto-listed (TSX) Nautilus Minerals (NUSMF), which planned to extract undersea gold and copper deposits off Papua New Guinea in 2019. He has also purchased, through Gallagher Holdings, an interest in Australian mining company Strike Resources, which is working on an iron ore deposit in Peru.

In November 2015, USM invested US$100 million in competitive video game esports team Virtus Pro.

In 2021, USM and Metalloinvest announced plans to construct one of the world's largest HBI eco-plants in Russia's Kursk region to supply greener products used to make steel amid a growing focus to clean up the industry.

Udokan Copper 
In 2008 Usmanov bought the Udokan licence, which was discovered in Soviet times and proved to be one of the world's largest copper deposit. Geologists estimate there are 26.7mn tonnes of copper ore under the JORC classification.

In 2020 Baikal Mining Company (rebranded to Udokan copper) began strip mining at the Udokan mine, which had been untouched since 1949 due to the site's remoteness and extreme weather conditions. The development of Udokan includes the construction of the first stage of a mining and metallurgical plant for the production of cathode copper and copper concentrate, as well as the production of up to 125,000 tpy of copper in addition to 12mn tonnes of ore.

Mail.Ru Group (rebranded to VK)
In 2008 Usmanov became acquainted with Yuri Milner, and soon became a shareholder of DST and VK (Mail.ru Group).

Usmanov had 25.3% of interest in VK, and 60.6% of voting interest until he sold a $530 million stake and reduced his interests to 17.9 and 58.1% in 2013.

In 2013 Usmanov through VK acquired Pavel Durov's shares in Vk.ru, to help Durov retain control under the Telegram app when UCP claimed on Telegram.

On 2 December 2021, Usmanov's holding shares were sold to Russian insurance company Sogaz.  Usmanov said that VK involvement has largely determined the development of USM.

Megafon 
Usmanov as of March 2022 was the majority shareholder of Russia's second-largest mobile telephone operator, MegaFon.

Portfolio investments 
In 2009 Facebook's founder and chief executive, Mark Zuckerberg turned to Russian investors at a meeting brokered by Goldman Sachs. Usmanov made his first investment to Facebook in 2009 by Mail.ru, investing $200 million for a 1.96% stake that valued Facebook at $10 billion. He accepted Zuckerberg's conditions and gave up the voting rights on those shares to him. Facebook's IPO in 2012 valued it several times greater and in selling his stake Usmanov won around $1 billion on it.

In 2011 the DST made an $800m investment in Twitter.

Through Mail.Ru Group Usmanov made notable investments in other international technology companies, including Groupon, Zynga, Airbnb, ZocDoc, Alibaba and 360buy.

In 2013, he was said to have invested $100 million in Apple. He subsequently disposed of his shares in early 2014.

The Alibaba investment was said by Usmanov to be up 500% in late 2014. The Facebook investment Usmanov implied he had sold, saying "I admire Facebook, but I said 'arrivederci' Facebook". At the same time, he said he had made an investment in "Chinese low-cost smartphone maker Xiaomi", saying it is a "future technology giant", and that he is looking to invest in India, particularly the online trade sector.

In September 2018, it was reported that Mail.ru would enter into a $2 billion joint venture with Alibaba Group Holding Ltd. The agreement would merge the online marketplaces of both companies in the Russian market and was backed by the Kremlin via the Russian Direct Investment Fund.

Kommersant and media firms

In August 2006, Usmanov began to invest in media. He bought Kommersant, a newspaper formerly owned by Russian oligarch Boris Berezovsky, for US$200 million. Usmanov also made a $25 million purchase of a 50% stake in Russian sports TV channel 7TV in November 2006 and bought 75% of Russian TV music channel Muz-TV for $300 million in June 2007. Usmanov was a co-owner of the media holding company UTH, which holds 51% of Disney Russia and 100% of Muz TV and U television channels. He sold his TV assets to his business-partner Ivan Tavrin in 2017.

Sport-related activities

Arsenal F.C.
Usmanov was a shareholder of the English football team Arsenal from 2007 to 2018. He moved into the football arena in August 2007 by acquiring a 14.58% stake in Arsenal. He and his business partner Farhad Moshiri bought the stake in the club owned by former Arsenal vice-chairman David Dein for £75 million. Dein was appointed head of their investment vehicle, Red and White Holdings, which became the largest shareholder in the club outside of members of the board of directors.

On 28 September 2007, Red and White Holdings increased its shareholding to 23%, making it the second-largest shareholder in the club behind Arsenal non-executive director Danny Fiszman. On 15 February 2008, he increased it to over 24%, just short of Fiszman's 24.11%. He increased it to 25% on 16 February 2009. Red and White Holdings confirmed that it was the club's largest shareholder, and the company said it "has the necessary funding to increase its stake further [but] it has no current intention to make a full takeover bid for Arsenal for six months." If the stake were to reach 30%, Red and White Holdings would have to launch a formal takeover.

Usmanov's interest precipitated a "lock-down" agreement by the Gunners' board, whereby chairman Peter Hill-Wood announced that club directors could sell their stakes only to "permitted persons" before April 2009, and had to give fellow board members "first option" on shares until October 2012. "The lockdown ... makes us bullet-proof," said then Arsenal managing director Keith Edelman.

American businessman Stan Kroenke, already a major Arsenal shareholder, increased his stake in the club to just over 62% in April 2011 after buying out Fiszman and Lady Bracewell-Smith, making him the majority shareholder. As Kroenke's stake had risen above 30%, he was obliged to make an offer to buy out the remainder of Arsenal shares. Usmanov refused to sell, however, and maintained his stake.

Usmanov increased his Arsenal share beyond 29% in June 2011. He then purchased shares held by Scottish football club Rangers in February 2012. As of October 2013, he owned over 30% of the club. Usmanov criticized Arsenal's lack of ambition and financial model in an open letter sent to the board on 5 July 2012. He asserted that he had no intention of selling his shares.

On 7 August 2018, however, Usmanov accepted a bid of £550m for his shares at Arsenal. He sold his shares in 2018 to Kroenke.

Everton F.C.
In January 2017, Usmanov's holding company, USM, entered a five-year, $15 million+ deal with Everton F.C. for the naming rights of the club's training ground, Finch Farm.  Usmanov's accountant and partner in USM holdings is Farhad Moshiri, the current majority shareholder of Everton, and former co-owner of Usmanov's Arsenal shares, Red and White holdings. In 2019 Megafon became the sleeve sponsor for the men's training wear of Everton and its official matchday presenting partner. In 2020 MegaFon expanded their commercial agreement with Everton to become the main sponsor of the women's team.

In March 2022, Everton suspended its sponsorship ties with USM and MegaFon in light of the Russian invasion of Ukraine.

International Fencing Federation (FIE) 
A former sabre fencer for the former Uzbek Soviet Socialist Republic, Usmanov supported the promotion of fencing through his charity fund "For the Future of Fencing", created in 2004.

He was president of the Russian Fencing Federation from 2001 to 2009. He was concurrently president of the European Fencing Confederation from 2005 to 2009.

He was elected president of the International Fencing Federation (FIE) in 2008 with 66 votes to 61 for incumbent president René Roch. He was re-elected in 2012 and 2016. In 2021, Usmanov was re-elected by acclamation to a fourth term, for which he was congratulated by Vladimir Putin.

In that position, Usmanov implemented a number of initiatives, including the expansion of the Olympic fencing programme to 12 disciplines.

On 28 February 2022, in reaction to the Russian invasion of Ukraine, the European Union blacklisted Usmanov, imposing an EU-wide travel ban on him and freezing all of his assets. The EU stated: "He has been referred to as one of Vladimir Putin's favourite oligarchs." Following the imposition of the sanctions on him, Usmanov announced on 1 March 2022, in an accusatory letter, that he was stepping down as FIE President.

Despite Usmanov's temporary resignation, on 10 March 2023, the FIE became the first Olympic governing body to officially reinstate Russian and Belarusian athletes and officials, in time for the start of the qualification for the 2024 Summer Olympics.

Other 
In February 2008, Metalloinvest became sponsor of Dinamo Moscow, a football team in Russia's capital. His Metalloinvest group's name replaced the Xerox Corporation's on its players' shirts as part of the $7 million deal.

Usmanov was a member of the Councils of the 2014 Sochi XXII Olympic Winter Games and XI Paralympic Winter Games. He is also a member of the Board of Trustees of the Russian Olympian Sportsmen Support Fund. In 2015 it was announced that USM invested the equivalent of US$100 million in the Eastern European eSports team Virtus.pro.

Controversies

Suppression of online criticism 
On 2 September 2007, Craig Murray, the former British ambassador to Uzbekistan referred to Usmanov's criminal conviction, claiming that Usmanov "was in no sense a political prisoner, but a gangster and racketeer who rightly did six years in jail" and his pardon was the work of Uzbekistan President Islam Karimov on the instructions of Uzbekistani power broker and alleged drug trafficker Gafur Rakhimov. In the face of libel threats from Usmanov's lawyers Schillings, some media had to apologize for publishing them. Murray persists in the allegation. The article was subsequently removed by Murray's web host, allegedly under pressure from Usmanov's legal team, London's Schillings law firm. However, what followed was that Schillings contacted owners of independent blogs and websites warning them to remove any references to Murray's allegations, and any reproduction of Murray's blog post. UK Indymedia reported that they were one of the sites that had been issued with a take-down notice, on 10 September 2007 and again on 21 September. On 20 September 2007, Bloggerheads.com, the weblog of Tim Ireland, was taken down for reproducing Murray's article, incidentally causing the loss of other blogs belonging to the MP Boris Johnson and councillor Bob Piper – neither of which had been used to repost the article.

Kommersant
On 12 December 2011, following the 2011 Russian protests regarding vote-rigging in parliamentary elections, the weekly Kommersant Vlast magazine ran an unflattering issue on Vladimir Putin titled "Victory of United ballot-stuffers" – a pun on Putin's United Russia party. Usmanov sacked the editor, Maxim Kovalsky, and the head of the publisher's holding company, Andrei Galiyev, saying there had been an "ethical breach" and that the issue "bordered on petty hooliganism". The controversy surrounded an image of a ballot paper from the parliamentary vote with the words "Putin, go fuck yourself" scrawled in red ink. The caption read: "A correctly filled out ballot recognized as invalid." Demyan Kudryavtsev, the head of the Kommersant publishing house, assumed responsibility by resigning, stating in a blog post that the magazine issue had been "in violation of internal procedures, professional journalistic standards and the Russian law".

Nadezhda Azhgihina, executive secretary of the Russian Union of Journalists, was shocked by the incident, calling it "a clear example of censorship from the owner". On 14 December 60 journalists from the Kommersant newspaper signed an open letter to Usmanov, saying, "We are being compelled to be cowards, which is unworthy and unproductive...We regard [Kovalsky's] dismissal as an act of intimidation aimed at preventing any critical words about Vladimir Putin...We take particular offense at the attempt to present the dismissal of a man for his professional position as a fight for the purity of the Russian language. This is the same kind of fabrication that offended people at the election." Usmanov responded that emotionally, he could "understand the journalists speaking up for sacked top managers" but that "Kommersant Vlast is a respectable, independent, socio-political publication." Mikhail Prokhorov, who had announced his candidacy for the 2012 presidential election, offered to buy Kommersant on the same day, but Usmanov rejected the offer.

English Wikipedia
On 12 November 2012, the British newspaper The Times reported that Usmanov had hired a London-based PR firm, RLM Finsbury, that edited Usmanov's article on the online encyclopedia English Wikipedia to remove information on Usmanov's criminal convictions and later controversies surrounding their client. The discovery caused significant backlash among the PR professionals in the UK, with the CEO of the Chartered Institute of Public Relations stressing that "public relations professionals should not directly edit Wikipedia for a client or employer". The PR firm acknowledged their actions and stated that they had acted without the authorisation of their client. The information was said to have been removed in expectation of the stock market listing of MegaFon, which is controlled by Usmanov.

Corruption allegations 
In 2018 US Senators Marco Rubio, Roger Wicker, Lindsey Graham, and Cory Gardner called on the Trump administration to sanction Usmanov over what they allege is his corruption and bribery of Russian government officials.

Sanctions 
On 28 February 2022, in reaction to the 2022 Russian invasion of Ukraine, the European Union blacklisted Usmanov, imposing an EU-wide travel ban on him and freezing all his assets. On 3 March, the United States imposed similar sanctions on him, with some exceptions for his companies. Usmanov was named in the Official Journal of the European Union, the publication of record of the EU, as a "pro-Kremlin oligarch with particularly close ties to Russian President Vladimir Putin [who is] one of Vladimir Putin's favorite oligarchs." 

In March 2022, the German federal government set up a task force to track down oligarch funds in Germany. Several ministries and authorities are involved, from the Ministry of Economics and Finance, the financial supervisory authority BaFin, the Federal Criminal Police Office, customs and the Federal Intelligence Service (BND). Authorities of this task force have been looking for Usmanov's property and assets that could be frozen and secured. Several villas on the Bavarian Tegernsee are said to belong to the oligarch. The German Federal Criminal Police Office is said to have come across 36 offshore companies and 90 suspicious money laundering reports in connection with Usmanov alone.

Usmanov's sister, Ismailova, was legally the beneficiary of the trust which owns the super-yacht Dilbar, before the EU imposed sanctions on her. The ship was seized in Hamburg. Another sister of the oligarch, Saodat Narzieva, was also on the EU sanctions list. But after investigations were published, proving that the data from "Suisse Secrets", according to which Narzieva was said to have been the beneficial owner of up to 27 accounts at the major Swiss bank Credit Suisse were false, on 14 September 2022 the EU lifted sanctions from her.

In November it was reported that the Uzbek government had lobbied the EU to lift sanctions on Usmanov, stating that the sanctions were restricting his ability to invest in his home nation.

In December 2022, a Ukraine Court ordered the seizure of UAH 2 billion (US$54 million) worth of Usmanov's assets, comprising 160,000 tonnes of Ukrainian iron ore. Metalloinvest, in a statement published on 28 December, denied the information, saying that the Ukrainian authorities arrested iron ore raw materials produced by Metalloinvest's enterprises in Russia and intended for its buyers abroad. These were goods blocked for the export shipment by the Ukrainian authorities back in February 2022.

Personal life 

Usmanov has no biological children. He has a stepson with his wife Irina Viner. The stepson is a real-estate investor, currently constructing 30 real estate projects.

In 2012, it was claimed by businessman Boris Berezovsky that Usmanov was given Sutton Place as part of a business deal, a claim that Usmanov denied. Usmanov also owns a  property in Moscow and a villa on the Italian island of Sardinia.

Wealth 
Usmanov is estimated to be among the world's 100 wealthiest individuals. Data in leaks such as the Suisse Secrets, the Panama Papers, and FinCEN Files, shows that his wealth is held through an elaborate network of shell companies and trusts, as well as dispersal of his assets to relatives.

His sister Saodat Narzieva owns 27 Swiss bank accounts through which billions of dollars pass. One of the accounts held over $2.1 billion in 2011.

Usmanov has owned three luxury yachts named Dilbar, after his mother. In 2005 he took delivery of the first Dilbar (now [[Luna B (yacht)|Luna B]]) from Oceanco at a reported cost of $60 million. A second Dilbar (now Al Raya) was delivered by Lürssen in 2008 at a reported cost of $250 million. As of 2019 it was the 38th largest motor yacht by length, measuring 110.0 m (361 ft). In 2015 Usmanov commissioned the third Dilbar, the current largest yacht in the world by gross tonnage (15,917 gt) and the 6th largest yacht by length measuring 156.0 m (512 ft). It is reported to have cost $800 million, employ 84 full-time crew members, and contain the largest indoor swimming pool installed on a superyacht at 180 cubic metres. After taking delivery of the second Dilbar, Usmanov renamed the original Ona and sold it in 2010. He later repeated that process when the second Dilbar was renamed Ona and was sold to a middle-eastern buyer in 2018. On 2 March 2022, German authorities seized Dilbar in Hamburg as part of sanctions against Usmanov stemming from the 2022 Russian Invasion of Ukraine. On April 15, 2022, the yacht was frozen by Germany after investigations regarding its ownership revealed that Dilbar belong to Usmanov's sister, who was also sanctioned.

According to the Index, Usmanov's net worth fell by nearly a quarter from  February 22 to March 15, 2022, as the West imposed sanctions following the 2022 Russian invasion of Ukraine.

 Philanthropy 
In 2021, The Sunday Times named Usmanov the most generous philanthropist on its Rich List, donating more than £4.2 billion to charity personally and by his businesses over the 20-year history of The Sunday Times Giving List. In 2012, Russian Forbes named Usmanov Philanthropist of the Year. In 2006 Usmanov founded "Art, Science and Sport" Charity Fund. The Fund is in close cooperation with London's Tate Britain. Together they carried out several projects in Russia such as the Turner exhibition in 2009 and the Pre-Raphaelites exhibition in 2013. Usmanov is a Trustee for a range of social, educational and cultural organisations, including the Russian Geographical Society, Moscow State Institute of International Relations, National Research University Higher School of Economics, and the European University at St Petersburg. In 2015 he donated €1.5 million toward the restoration of Rome's Basilica Ulpia.

In February 2020, it was revealed Usmanov purchased Pierre de Coubertin's original 1892 Olympic Manifesto for $8.8 million. He then donated it to the Olympic Museum. The manifesto has become the world's most expensive piece of sports memorabilia. Two years in a row, in 2020 and 2021, Usmanov topped the list of contributors to the fight against COVID-19 among the participants of The Sunday Times Rich List with donations Russia, Uzbekistan and Italy of £134.2 m. In 2020 Usmanov said in an interview with the Financial Times'' that he will leave his assets to his family and USM management: "Many people have helped me. So I want to help my family and my management by giving them my shares. Fifty per cent to family, fifty per cent to management, who deserve this, in my view".

On 17 September 2007, Usmanov paid more than £20 million for an art collection owned by the late Russian cellist Mstislav Rostropovich, days before it was to be auctioned by Sotheby's in London. He gave all the artwork to the Russian state, where it is housed in the Konstantinovsky Palace near St. Petersburg. Later that same month he purchased the rights to a large collection of Soviet cartoons, which for fifteen years had been owned by Russian-born actor Oleg Vidov, who emigrated to the United States in 1985. After the deal, valued at $5–10 million, Usmanov donated the cartoon collection to a newly formed Russian children's television channel.

According to presidential decree No. 365 of 17 March 2004, Usmanov was awarded with a Medal of Honor of Russia. In 2011, Usmanov received the Order of Friendship of the Republic of Kazakhstan. In 2013, he was awarded the Order for Service to the Fatherland IV class in recognition of his services to the state, as well as his community and charitable activities. In the same year, he was awarded a medal 'For contribution to international cooperation' by the Foreign Ministry of Russia. In 2014, Usmanov received the Order of Alexander Nevsky for his community and charitable activities. In 2016 he received The Decoration "For Beneficence" for his contribution to charitable and social activities in Russia. The same year Usmanov received the Al-Fahr Order for his great contribution to the revival of Islam in Russia. In 2018 Usmanov received the Order "For Merit to the Fatherland" 3rd class.

On 4 December 2014, Usmanov paid $4.8m for Dr James Watson's Nobel Prize Medal in Physiology or Medicine, which was auctioned at Christie's in New York City. Watson was selling his prize to raise money to support scientific research. After auctions fees, Watson received $4.1m. Usmanov subsequently returned the medal to Watson, stating "in my opinion, a situation in which an outstanding scientist sells a medal recognizing his achievements is unacceptable. Watson's work contributed to cancer research, the illness from which my father died. It is important for me that the money that I spent on this medal will go to supporting scientific research, and the medal will stay with the person who deserved it."

See also 
List of Russian billionaires
Russian oligarchs
List of people and organizations sanctioned during the Russo-Ukrainian War

References

External links
 
 Russian Capitalist Wiki Profile
 Usmanov's profile and assets on Russian Asset Tracker

1953 births
Living people
People from Namangan Region
Moscow State Institute of International Relations alumni
Prisoners and detainees of the Soviet Union
Uzbekistani businesspeople
Russian oligarchs
Russian mass media owners
Russian newspaper publishers (people)
Russian people of Uzbek descent
Uzbekistani prisoners and detainees
Russian billionaires
Russian Muslims
Russian philanthropists
Russian football chairmen and investors
FC Dynamo Moscow
Arsenal F.C. directors and chairmen
Financial University under the Government of the Russian Federation alumni
Russian mining businesspeople
Russian businesspeople in the United Kingdom
People named in the Paradise Papers
Russian individuals subject to the U.S. Department of the Treasury sanctions
Russian individuals subject to European Union sanctions
Specially Designated Nationals and Blocked Persons List
Russian individuals subject to United Kingdom sanctions